Diduga annutata is a moth of the subfamily Arctiinae first described by George Hampson in 1900. It is found on Sumbawa and Borneo.

Adults have pale brown wings with dark brown fasciae.

References

Nudariina